Attila Yıldırım (born 22 November 1990) is a Dutch professional footballer who plays as a striker for Tarsus İdman Yurdu.

Career
Yıldırım has played club football in the Netherlands and Turkey for Utrecht, Kasımpaşa and Konyaspor.

Personal life
Yildirim was born in Germany to a Turkish family from Sivas. He moved to the Netherlands at a young age, and joined the AFC Ajax youth academy at the age of 7.

References

1990 births
Living people
People from Bad Mergentheim
Sportspeople from Stuttgart (region)
Dutch footballers
German footballers
Dutch people of Turkish descent
German people of Turkish descent
FC Utrecht players
Eredivisie players
Konyaspor footballers
Bucaspor footballers
Association football forwards
TFF First League players
Footballers from Baden-Württemberg